"Teflon" is a song by Australian alternative rock band, Jebediah. "Teflon" was released on 23 March 1998 as the third single from the band's debut studio album, Slightly Odway and peaked at number 41 on the Australian ARIA Singles Chart. It polled at number 42 in the Triple J Hottest 100 music poll for 1998.

In October 1998 Jedediah performed "Teflon" at the ARIA Music Awards ceremony. A live version recorded in London was issued on a bonus disc of an extended version of their fifth studio album, Kosciuszko, in April 2011.

Track listing

Credits

Jebediah members
 Chris Daymond – guitar
 Brett Mitchell – drums
 Kevin Mitchell – vocals
 Vanessa Thornton – bass guitar

Recording details
 Chris Lord-Alge – mixer
 Ben Steele – photography, artwork layout, design
 Andrew Christie – artwork layout, design
 Steve Smart – mastering
 Neill King – producer ("Teflon")
 Laurie Singara – producer ("You")
 Graham Hill – producer ("Tracksuit", "Jerks of Attention")

Charts

References

1998 singles
Jebediah songs
1997 songs
Songs written by Kevin Mitchell (musician)
Murmur (record label) singles